The Atom Besieged: Extraparliamentary Dissent in France and Germany is a 1981 book by Dorothy Nelkin and Michael Pollak.  This book examines the opposition to nuclear power in France and West Germany in the 1970s, which is assessed as being broadly based and widespread. The authors argue that the basic fear which accounted for the vehemence of the opposition is that nuclear power fundamentally alters the makeup of society.

References

1981 non-fiction books
Political books
Books about nuclear issues